is a railway station in the city of Tsushima, Aichi Prefecture, Japan , operated by Meitetsu.

Lines

Station layout
The station has a two opposed side platforms connected by a footbridge. The platforms are not even: the platform for trains in the direction of Nagoya is longer, and can accommodate trains of eight carriages in length, whereas the opposing platform is shorter, and can accommodate trains of only up to six carriages. The station is staffed.

Platforms

Adjacent stations

|-
!colspan=5|Nagoya Railroad

Station history
Aotsuka Station was opened on January 23, 1914. The station building was rebuilt in 2005.

Passenger statistics
In fiscal 2017, the station was used by an average of 1861 passengers daily.

Surrounding area
site of Nishi-Mizoguchi Castle

See also
 List of Railway Stations in Japan

References

External links

 Official web page 

Railway stations in Japan opened in 1914
Railway stations in Aichi Prefecture
Stations of Nagoya Railroad
Tsushima, Aichi